Micrasema bactro is a species of humpless casemaker caddisfly in the family Brachycentridae. It is found in North America.

References

Trichoptera
Articles created by Qbugbot
Insects described in 1938